{{DISPLAYTITLE:C30H24O12}}
The molecular formula C30H24O12 (molar mass : 576.5 g/mol, exact mass : 576.126776 u) may refer to :
 Proanthocyanidin A1, an A type proanthocyanidin
 Proanthocyanidin A2, an A type proanthocyanidin

Molecular formulas